Earle is an unincorporated community in Scott Township, Vanderburgh County, in the U.S. state of Indiana.

Earle's main features include Pizza Depot, a Marathon gas station with a Bonkerz store, and a sit-down restaurant called the Hornet's Nest, frequented by residents.

History
A post office was established at Earle in 1871, and remained in operation until it was discontinued in 1901.

Geography

References

Unincorporated communities in Vanderburgh County, Indiana
Unincorporated communities in Indiana